KBSU may refer to:

 KBSU-FM, a radio station (90.3 FM) licensed to Boise, Idaho, United States
 KDBI (AM), a radio station (730 AM) licensed to Boise, Idaho, which held the call sign KBSU from 1992 to 2011